Volha Dubouskaya (née Salevich - ; born 9 October 1983 in Bolshie Shilovichi) is a Belarusian long-distance runner. She competed in the marathon at the 2012 Summer Olympics, placing 78th with a time of 2:39:12.

References

1983 births
Living people
Belarusian female long-distance runners
Olympic athletes of Belarus
Athletes (track and field) at the 2012 Summer Olympics